Pseudosuccinea is a genus of air-breathing freshwater snails, aquatic pulmonate gastropod mollusks in the family Lymnaeidae, the pond snails.

In this genus, the shells are very similar to those of the land snail genus Succinea, which belongs to a different family.

Species
Species within the genus Pseudosuccinea include:
 Pseudosuccinea columella (Say, 1817)
 † Pseudosuccinea dineana (D. W. Taylor, 1957)

References 

Lymnaeidae